Dakota William Nicholas Lucas (born 26 July 1991) is a New Zealand football player who last played for Manningham United FC in the Victorian State League Division 1 in 2015.

In June 2012 Lucas was named in the New Zealand football team to compete in the Men's Olympic Football Tournament. Dakota scored his first goal for the NZ Under 23's in an Olympic warmup match versus Japan, slotting in a 90-minute equaliser meaning the game finished 1–1.

Lucas made one appearance at the 2012 London Olympics playing in New Zealand's third and last match, a 3–0 defeat by Brazil.

Lucas moved to Manningham United FC in 2015 and made a total of 6 senior appearances failing to score a goal.

References

External links

NZ Football profile
Team Wellington profile
2012 London Olympics profile 

1991 births
Living people
New Zealand association footballers
Team Wellington players
Olympic association footballers of New Zealand
Footballers at the 2012 Summer Olympics
Sunshine Coast F.C. players
Hawke's Bay United FC players
Association football forwards
Association football midfielders